Maria von Heland (born 25 May 1965) is a Swedish film director and screenwriter. She works in English, German, Swedish and French and is based in Berlin, Germany.

Early Life

Maria von Heland (born 25 May 1965 in Stockholm, Sweden) gained a Bachelor of Arts in journalism at Rider University in Lawrenceville, New Jersey after finishing high school in Sweden. From 1990 to 1995 she gained a Master of Fine Arts in directing at the California Institute of the Arts, where she studied under Alexander Mackendrick, and at the School of Film and Video in Los Angeles. During this time she was an exchange student at the Konrad Wolf Akademie for Film and Television in Potsdam-Babelsberg, Germany.

Career

Since 1997 von Heland has directed or produced over 20 films, TV dramas and series. She has over 50 credits in the IMDB database. She has won 11 industry awards, including the Series Mania International Panorama award 2022 for the upcoming Netflix series Sunshine Eyes, and has been nominated three times for the International Emmys.

From 2010 to 2018 she directed the annual European Film Awards, and is a member of the European Film Academy.

Filmography

References

1965 births
Swedish film directors
Swedish women film directors
Swedish screenwriters
Swedish women screenwriters
People from Stockholm
California Institute of the Arts alumni
Living people